Sumanth Kumar Yarlagadda (born 9 February 1975), known mononymously as Sumanth, is an Indian actor who works predominantly in Telugu cinema. He is the eldest grandson of Telugu actor Akkineni Nageswara Rao. He is also a partner in Annapurna Studios.

Sumanth's most notable films are  Prema Katha (1999),  Yuvakudu (2000), Satyam(2003),Gowri (2004),  Godavari (2006), Madhumasam (2008), Golconda High School (2011), Malli Raava (2017), and Sita Ramam (2022).

Background and early life
Sumanth was born in Hyderabad, India, on 9 February 1975. He is the only son of Surendra Yarlagadda and Satyavathi Akkineni. He is the eldest grandchild of the Telugu film actor Akkineni Nageswara Rao. A few months after his birth, Sumanth's parents returned to the US where they were residing. Sumanth, however, remained in India on the request of his grandfather Akkineni Nageswara Rao, who was then on a hiatus from films after a major heart surgery. The latter had often said that his busy acting career prevented him from fully experiencing fatherhood with his own children, so he wished to raise his first grandchild himself. Subsequently, Sumanth was adopted by his maternal grandparents.

Family
Sumanth's father, Surendra Yarlagadda, is a former film producer, noted for several hit films such as Muchataga Mugguru (1985), Collector Gari Abbayi (1987), Rao Gari Illu (1988), Siva (1989), and Gaayam (1993). Sumanth has 1 Younger Sister : Supriya Yarlagadda, who is the executive director of Annapurna Studios. Actor Nagarjuna Akkineni is his maternal uncle and producer D. Ramanaidu is his uncle from his paternal side. Producer Daggubati Suresh Babu and actors Venkatesh Daggubati, Rana Daggubati, Naga Chaitanya, Akhil Akkineni, and Sushanth are his cousins.

In August 2004, Sumanth married former actress Keerthi Reddy. They, however, were divorced amicably in 2006.

Education
Sumanth studied at the Hyderabad Public School, graduating in 1991. For his undergraduate studies, he enrolled in an engineering course in Michigan. Realising after two years that it wasn't in his best interest, he transferred to Columbia College Chicago, from where he graduated with a B. A. in Film Studies in 1997.

Filmography

As actor

As dubbing artist 
83 (2021) for Ranveer Singh (Telugu dubbed version)

References

External links 

Living people
Indian male film actors
1975 births
Columbia College Chicago alumni
20th-century Indian male actors
Male actors from Hyderabad, India
Male actors in Telugu cinema
Telugu male actors
21st-century Indian male actors